Wang Weiyi (born 31 January 1974 in Shaanxi) is a Chinese rifle shooter. He competed in the 50 m rifle prone event at the 2012 Summer Olympics, where he placed 28th.

References

1974 births
Living people
Chinese male sport shooters
Olympic shooters of China
Shooters at the 2012 Summer Olympics
Sport shooters from Shaanxi
Asian Games medalists in shooting
Shooters at the 2002 Asian Games
Shooters at the 2010 Asian Games
Asian Games silver medalists for China
Medalists at the 2002 Asian Games
Medalists at the 2010 Asian Games
21st-century Chinese people